The Sheng Jing Hospital was founded by Dugald Christie (missionary) (1855-1936), a Scottish missionary doctor in 1883. It was the base on which the Mukden Medical College was formed, also by Christie, in 1912. In 1949 the Mukden Medical College was absorbed by the China Medical University and the hospital became known as the 2nd Affiliated hospital of the China Medical University.  In 1969 it was moved, by Chairman Mao, to Chaoyang but returned to Shenyang in 1983. In 2002 the hospital took over the Third Affiliated Hospital of the China Medical University and set up the Huaxiang Campus.  In 2003, on the 120th anniversary of its founding, it restored the name as Shenjing Hospital. It is situated near the famous San Hao Jie (Computer town)三好街. The hospital is one of the largest hospitals in the city of Shenyang, Liaoning Province. Its motto is "United and dedicated; Disciplined and responsible; Caring and trustworthy; Professional and innovative."

In 2012 a history of the hospital and Dr Christie was published by Liaoning University Press.

The hospital is known for its famous specialists clinic.

Address:36 No.3 Street, Heping District

Departments

Neurology

Cardiology

Dermatology

Ophthalmology

Stomatology

Otolaryngology

Pulmonology

Pediatrics

Neuro-surgery

Cardio-surgery

Thoracic Surgery

Orthopedics

Anesthesia

General Surgery

Gynecology and Obstetrics

Infectious disease

Trauma Centre

Integrated Clinic Of TCM and Western Medicine

Radiology

See also
Mukden Medical College
China Medical University (PRC)

References

Gallery

External links
 Official Site of Sheng Jing Hospital
 Ministry Of Health,PRC
 China Medical University
 China Medical University -English Version

Hospitals in Liaoning
Teaching hospitals in China
Buildings and structures in Shenyang
Hospitals established in 1883
1883 establishments in China